Smells Like Saturday is a once weekly comedy/music/talk morning radio show presented by the puppet characters Zig and Zag. It is broadcast on Irish radio station 2FM and airs from 10:00-12:00 midday every Saturday morning. The characters present the show from the fictional "Studio Z’ which Zig and Zag claim is their old spaceship from the Eighties; the "Zogmobile" which means they can often fly the studio to exotic locations during the show. The shows theme tune is The Moog Cookbook’s instrumental cover version of Nirvana's "Smells Like Teen Spirit" where the radio show derived its title.

History
Zig and Zag initially debuted as characters on the Irish programming block Dempsey’s Den, later gaining their own TV shows on MTV Europe and Channel 4.

Ratings
After only five months on air the radio show gained an impressive listenership and has the third highest audience figures on 2FM with an impressive 143,000 listeners, beating one of the stations flagship show Breakfast with Hector and beaten only by Ryan Tubridy with 216,000 and Colm Hayes with 161,000 according to the JNLR figures released on 17 February 2011.

In the JNLR figures released on 5 May 2011 the show gained a further 5000 listeners and became the stations second most listened to radio show behind Ryan Tubridy with 148,000 radio fans tuning in every Saturday morning. This is unprecedented success for a weekend radio show on 2FM.

Regular features
" Smells Like Saturday’’ as a comedy/ music hybrid has a number of regular and one off features.

Under the Coverz
Zig’s knack for finding really cool cover versions of popular hits.

Torty The Tortoise
Torty the Tortoise is a character who is also known as 'The Tortoise of Hits' and  the 'Hitpicker in a Half Shell'. Zig and Zag claim that their Tortoise, who spins around on his back and chooses the greatest ‘hits’ of a particular type as requested from listeners and challenged by Zig and Zag.

Soundalikez
Harking back to their time on the Ian Dempsey radio show on 2FM in the late Eighties Zig and Zag play lyrics from songs that sound like something else (mondegreens). For instance; The Fray song 'How to save a Life' they claim is "How to save a Lime" or the chorus of  Brandon Flowers – Crossfire sounds like "Lay your bunny down" as opposed to the actual lyric "lay your body down". These misread lyrics are always embellished with a strange story as to 'real' meaning of the song.

Spot the Sausage
Another popular segment is the "Spot the Sausage Quiz" which takes place once a week with a lucky listener winning ‘stuff’ with every correct answer. The quiz is based around a simple ‘name the missing word’ format. The missing words have been replaced with the word ‘Sausage’. Ie; ‘Lady Gaga had a hit with SAUSAGE face’

Things to Do at the Weekend
This is Zig and Zag's weekly guide for events and ideas for weekend activitiesfrom all around Ireland that they have chosen for the listeners.

Celebrity Sizzle
Zig and Zag present a weekly gossip and cheeky celebrity news item.

Soapy Saturday
Zig and Zag often turn on their TV station ‘Channel Z’ and tune into their favourite soap ‘Unfair City’ which is their skit on RTÉ long-running series Fair City. It features the characters (all voiced by Zig and Zag) Mr. Ethnic Diversity, Mrs. Biscuits, Garda Neenaw and Paddy Rashers.

Pop Tennis
In their own unusual version of  Pop music Top Trumps Zig and Zag take to the tennis court for an elaborate tennis match where they volley facts back and forth with bands that listeners have requested. Zig and Zag also take on the rolls of  commentators ‘Bob and Bob’

The Birthday Roller
Harking back to old The Den days Zag takes on the roll of ‘Ragga Zagga’ and raps birthday requests at the end of every show.

Zig’s Poetry Corner
Zag, wanting to bring some Saturday morning classiness to the show persuades Zig to read out some poetry, however despite the classical music in the background and polite applause Zig inevitably reads out song lyrics from hot club tracks in a posh style, until Zag realises that he's been duped.

Showbiz Buzz
Zig and Zag dig out their little black book to do a celebrity wake up call. Once the celebrity has gotten over being woken they have a fun interview. From Ryan Tubridy to Coronation Street’s Michelle Keegan, from Dr. Alban to The Sawdoctors Zig and Zag will wake up anyone for a chat.

Me Two
A listener gets the opportunity to take over the radio for six minutes to play their favourite ever two songs!

Special shows

Smells Like Christmas
On Christmas Day 2010 Zig and Zag will host a special ‘Smells Like Saturday’ show, featuring lots of listener ‘shout outs’, Christmas music and they will fly to the North Pole to deliver a present to Santa from the people of Ireland.

References

External links
 Official site

RTÉ 2fm programmes